Sergio Daniel López (born 4 January 1989) is an Argentine footballer currently playing for Ecuadorian team Aucas.

External links
 Profile at BDFA 
 

1989 births
Living people
Argentine footballers
Argentine expatriate footballers
Club Atlético Temperley footballers
Godoy Cruz Antonio Tomba footballers
Unión Española footballers
Deportes Temuco footballers
Club Deportivo Palestino footballers
Gimnasia y Esgrima de Mendoza footballers
Once Caldas footballers
Delfín S.C. footballers
S.D. Aucas footballers
Barcelona S.C. footballers
Chilean Primera División players
Argentine Primera División players
Ecuadorian Serie A players
Association football midfielders
Argentine expatriate sportspeople in Chile
Argentine expatriate sportspeople in Ecuador
Expatriate footballers in Chile
Expatriate footballers in Ecuador
People from Lomas de Zamora
Sportspeople from Buenos Aires Province